Lee Murray is the stage name of Murray Cruchley, a Canadian actor and radio personality.

Roles
 City on Fire (1979) – Tony Miller
 Death Ship (1980) – Parsons
 The Agency (1980) – New Copywriter
 Scanners (1981) – Programmer 1
 Dirty Tricks (1981) – Anchorman
 Countdown to Looking Glass (1984) – James Otis
 Santa Barbara (1985) – Mort Zimmerman
 In Like Flynn (1985) – Fulton
 The Raccoons (1985–1986) – Dan the Forest Ranger
 Bloody Wednesday (1987) – Lou Cramer
 Bluffing It (1987)
 Alfred Hitchcock Presents (1987–1988) – Dr. Stevens
 Dead Ringers (1988) – Assisting Surgeon
 Growing Up in the World Next Door (1988) – Narrator
 Katts and Dog (1989) – Mr. Kirk
 Sing (1989) – Insurance Man
 Street Legal (1989–1992) – Blair Mitchell
 Getting Married in Buffalo Jump (1990) – Robert Marcovich
 Clarence (1990) – English Teacher
 Nilus the Sandman: The Boy Who Dreamed Christmas (1991) – Mr. Fletcher (voice)
 My Secret Identity (1989–1991) – Richard
 RoboCop (1994) – Announcer, Motel Greeter, Man in Lab Coat
 Side Effects (1995) – Dr. Nordover
 Nilus the Sandman: The First Day (1995) – Mr. Hunt

References

External links
 

Living people
Year of birth missing (living people)
Canadian male television actors
Canadian male voice actors